Christian Heritage can refer to:

 Christian Heritage Party of Canada, a political party.
 Christian Heritage New Zealand, a defunct New Zealand political party.
 Christian Heritage School (disambiguation), the name of several different private schools in the United States.